The Visitor (Italian: Cugini carnali) is a 1974 Italian comedy film directed by Sergio Martino and starring Susan Player,  Riccardo Cucciolla and Alfredo Pea. It was partly shot on location around Lecce.

Synopsis
A shy and inexperienced 16-year-old boy enjoys an awakening when his fast-living cousin from the city comes to stay at the family villa.

Cast

References

Bibliography
 Parish, James Robert. Film Actors Guide. Scarecrow Press, 1977.

External links 

1974 films
Italian comedy-drama films
1974 comedy-drama films
1970s Italian-language films
Films directed by Sergio Martino

Incest in film
1970s Italian films